Nataliia Oliinyk (born 9 July 1981) is a Ukrainian Paralympic powerlifter. She won the silver medal in the women's 79 kg event at the 2020 Summer Paralympics held in Tokyo, Japan. A few months later, she won the bronze medal in the women's 86 kg event at the 2021 World Para Powerlifting Championships held in Tbilisi, Georgia.

In March 2021, she won the silver medal in the women's 79 kg event at the 2021 World Para Powerlifting World Cup event held in Manchester, United Kingdom. In June 2021, she won the bronze medal in her event at the 2021 World Para Powerlifting World Cup event held in Dubai, United Arab Emirates.

References

External links
 

Living people
1981 births
Female powerlifters
Paralympic powerlifters of Ukraine
Powerlifters at the 2020 Summer Paralympics
Ukrainian powerlifters
Medalists at the 2020 Summer Paralympics
Paralympic silver medalists for Ukraine
Paralympic medalists in powerlifting
People from Popasna
Sportspeople from Luhansk Oblast
21st-century Ukrainian women